Sergio Andrés Ferreyra (born May 21, 1977) is an Argentine former swimmer, who specialized in breaststroke events. He is a multiple-time Argentine record holder, and a two-time medalist in the breaststroke (both 100 and 200 m) at the 2006 South American Games in Buenos Aires. He is also a member of Club Regatas Corrientes, and is coached and trained by Sergio Oscar Sainz.

Ferreyra made his first Argentine team, as a 23-year-old, at the 2000 Summer Olympics in Sydney, competing in two swimming events. In the 100 m breaststroke, Ferreyra rounded out the fifth heat to last place and fifty-third overall by less than 0.19 of a second behind Belarus' Aliaksandr Hukau in 1:05.75. He also placed eighteenth as a member of the Argentine team in the 4 × 100 m medley relay (3:43.61). Teaming with Eduardo Germán Otero, Pablo Martín Abal, and José Meolans, Ferreyra swam a breaststroke leg in a split of 1:02.73.

Eight years after competing in his last Olympics, Ferreyra qualified for his second Argentine team as a 31-year-old at the 2008 Summer Olympics in Beijing. He cleared FINA B-standard entry times of 1.03.06 (100 m breaststroke) and 2.18.01 (200 m breaststroke) from the national trials. In the 100 m breaststroke, Ferreyra challenged seven other swimmers on the third heat, including three-time Olympians Malick Fall of Senegal and Alwin de Prins of Luxembourg. He cruised to sixth place and fifty-second overall by a hundredth of a second (0.01) behind de Prins, outside his record time of 1:03.65. In his second event, 200 m breaststroke, Ferreyra recorded a slowest time of 2:20.10 on the first heat, finishing last out of 52 swimmers in the preliminaries.

References

External links
NBC 2008 Olympics profile

1977 births
Living people
Argentine male swimmers
Olympic swimmers of Argentina
Swimmers at the 1999 Pan American Games
Swimmers at the 2000 Summer Olympics
Swimmers at the 2008 Summer Olympics
Male breaststroke swimmers
South American Games silver medalists for Argentina
South American Games bronze medalists for Argentina
South American Games medalists in swimming
Competitors at the 2006 South American Games
Pan American Games competitors for Argentina
20th-century Argentine people
21st-century Argentine people